Javanais is a type of French slang where the extra syllable  is infixed inside a word after every consonant that is followed by a vowel, in order to render it incomprehensible. Some common examples are gros ("fat") which becomes gravos; bonjour ("hello"'), which becomes bavonjavour; and pénible ("annoying"), becomes pavénaviblave. Paris becomes Pavaravis.

Javanais is determined by the production rule:  CV → CavV.  There are also many variations that can be made upon the same pattern such as: CabV, CalV, CanV, etc.

In French the word Javanais is also used to refer to the Javanese language.

Around 1957, Boris Vian wrote a song La Java Javanaise. The lyrics are a didactical method to learn the javanais. Each verse is firstly articulated in regular French, then translated in slang. As the title suggests, the song is a Java, a Parisian dance craze. In 1962, Serge Gainsbourg wrote and sang a song called La Javanaise, a pun playing on Javanese dancing and the javanais style of speaking. The song heavily employs unaltered French words that naturally have an  sequence; thus the lyrics resemble the word game of javanais.

It's also possible to substitute other sounds in place of av, at and ab being the most popular.  It works well in English as well as French.  For example, the sentence: Today I decided to order some nice chocolates.  Could be:
Tabodabay abi dabecabidabed tabo abordaber sabome chabocabolabates.  The language is best spoken very fast to throw off listeners and care must be used when answering simple questions with yes/no.  It's usually best to come up with code words for yes/no such that those listening cannot catch on to the trick.

See also
Louchebem – a form of French slang similar to Pig Latin, originally called Largonji
Verlan – the inversion of syllables in a French word
Ubbi dubbi
Jerigonza

References

Cant languages
French slang
Language games